This is a round-up of the 1989 Sligo Intermediate Football Championship. Coolera/Strandhill claimed their first Intermediate title, after defeating St. Farnan's in the final. This year's Championship was extended from eight teams to eleven, as the structures were being altered.

First round

Quarter finals

Semi-finals

Sligo Intermediate Football Championship Final

Sligo Intermediate Football Championship
Sligo Intermediate Football Championship